Symmetromphalus regularis is a species of sea snail, a marine gastropod mollusk in the family Neomphalidae.

References

Neomphalidae
Gastropods described in 1990